This is a list of airlines that have an air operator's certificate issued by the Nigerian Civil Aviation Authority.

Airlines of Nigeria

See also
 List of defunct airlines of Nigeria
 List of airports in Nigeria
 List of airlines

References

External links
 List of popular airlines In Nigeria

Nigeria
Airlines
Airlines
Nigeria